Daniel Köllerer and Frank Moser were the defending champions, but they didn't try to defend their title.
Argentinian pair Diego Álvarez and Juan-Martín Aranguren defeated Henri Laaksonen and Philipp Oswald 6–4, 4–6, [10–2] in the final.

Seeds
First-seeded pair received a bye from the first round.

Draw

Draw

References
 Doubles Draw

IPP Trophy - Doubles
Geneva Open Challenger